The 1980 New York Mets season was the 19th regular season for the Mets, who played home games at Shea Stadium. Led by manager Joe Torre, the team had a 67–95 record and finished in fifth place in the National League East.

Offseason

The beginnings of the 1986 team 
On January 24, 1980, ownership of the team changed hands. The group that bought the Mets for an estimated $22 million (the largest amount paid for a ball club to that point) was headed by Nelson Doubleday, Jr. and Fred Wilpon. Doubleday was head of the old and distinguished publishing company that bore his name, while Wilpon was a highly successful real-estate developer. The new owners promised to invest money to acquire winning players and develop a competitive club, though it took a few years before the new partners were able to rebuild a solid contender.

In February, the new owners hired Frank Cashen, who had spent ten years in the front office of the Baltimore Orioles from 1966 to 1976, during which time the Orioles went to four World Series, winning two. During his tenure, the Mets would see what some called a "resuscitation", eventually leading to the team's first World Championship in 17 years. After leaving the Orioles, Cashen worked outside of baseball for three years before joining commissioner Bowie Kuhn's office as administrator of baseball. It was from this job that the Mets wooed him and installed him as executive vice president and general manager.

Regular season

On the field 
Due to their last-place finish in 1979, the Mets had the first pick in the 1980 Major League Baseball Draft. They used it to select an 18-year-old outfielder from Los Angeles, Darryl Strawberry, a key figure of future Mets teams.  With the twenty-third pick, they selected Billy Beane, later the protagonist in Moneyball.

Under Torre, the team suffered their 4th consecutive losing season, 24 games out of first place, although the Mets moved up one place in the standings to fifth. They even flirted with .500 (until losing 38 of their last 49 games), which may have led to attendance jumping nearly 400,000 to almost 1,200,000.  The team had the motto "The Magic is Back" during the 1980 season.  
Notable highlights from the season included three come-from-behind wins in five days: 5-4 and 6-5 over the Dodgers June 10 and 12 (after trailing 4-0 and 5-0), and 7-6 over the Giants on the 14th after trailing 6-0.  The Mets fell to earth in a five-game sweep at Shea by the eventual champion Phillies in mid-August, before which they were 56-57.  Their final home series against the Pirates drew just over 5,000 fans for three games combined.  

The construction of the then-state-of-the-art DiamondVision electronic scoreboard in center field for 1981 resulted in a sharp increase in ticket prices following this season, e.g., with General Admission seating rising from $1.50 to $4.00.

Season standings

Record vs. opponents

Opening Day starters 
 Doug Flynn
 Steve Henderson
 Mike Jorgensen
 Elliott Maddox
 Lee Mazzilli
 Jerry Morales
 John Stearns
 Craig Swan
 Frank Taveras

Notable transactions 
 June 3, 1980: 1980 Major League Baseball Draft
Darryl Strawberry was drafted by the Mets in the 1st round (1st pick). Player signed July 11, 1980.
Billy Beane was drafted by the Mets in the 1st round (23rd pick).
Ronn Reynolds was drafted by the Mets in the 5th round. Player signed June 7, 1980.
Rick Ownbey was drafted by the Mets in the 13th round.
Al Newman was drafted by the Mets in the 2nd round of the Secondary Phase, but did not sign.
 June 17, 1980: Kevin Kobel was traded by the Mets to the Kansas City Royals for Randy McGilberry.
 July 1, 1980: Randy Johnson was traded by the Mets to the Atlanta Braves for Bill Haselrig (minors).

Roster

Player stats

Batting

Starters by position 
Note: Pos = Position; G = Games played; AB = At bats; H = Hits; Avg. = Batting average; HR = Home runs; RBI = Runs batted in

Other batters 
Note: G = Games played; AB = At bats; H = Hits; Avg. = Batting average; HR = Home runs; RBI = Runs batted in

Pitching

Starting pitchers 
Note: G = Games pitched; IP = Innings pitched; W = Wins; L = Losses; ERA = Earned run average; SO = Strikeouts

Other pitchers 
Note: G = Games pitched; IP = Innings pitched; W = Wins; L = Losses; ERA = Earned run average; SO = Strikeouts

Relief pitchers 
Note: G = Games pitched; W = Wins; L = Losses; SV = Saves; ERA = Earned run average; SO = Strikeouts

Farm system

Notes

References 

1980 New York Mets at Baseball Reference
1980 New York Mets team page at www.baseball-almanac.com

New York Mets seasons
New York Mets season
New York Mets
1980s in Queens